The 26th Army Corps was an Army corps in the Imperial Russian Army.

Part of
1st Army: 1914
8th Army: 1914 - 1915
Russian Special Army: 1915
9th Army: 1915

Commanders
1914-1916: Aleksandr Gerngross
1916-1917: Yevgeny Miller

Corps of the Russian Empire